Xenotime is a rare-earth phosphate mineral, the major component of which is yttrium orthophosphate (YPO4). It forms a solid solution series with chernovite-(Y) (YAsO4) and therefore may contain trace impurities of arsenic, as well as silicon dioxide and calcium. The rare-earth elements dysprosium, erbium, terbium and ytterbium, as well as metal elements such as thorium and uranium (all replacing yttrium) are the expressive secondary components of xenotime. Due to uranium and thorium impurities, some xenotime specimens may be weakly to strongly radioactive. Lithiophyllite, monazite and purpurite are sometimes grouped with xenotime in the informal "anhydrous phosphates" group. Xenotime is used chiefly as a source of yttrium and heavy lanthanide metals (dysprosium, ytterbium, erbium and gadolinium). Occasionally, gemstones are also cut from the finest xenotime crystals.

Etymology 
The name xenotime is from the Greek words κενός vain and τιμή honor, akin to "vainglory". It was coined by French mineralogist François Sulpice Beudant as a rebuke of another scientist, Swedish chemist Jöns Jacob Berzelius, for the latter's premature claim to have found in the mineral a new chemical element (later understood to be previously discovered yttrium). The criticism was blunted, as over time "kenotime" was misread and misprinted "xenotime" with the error suggesting the etymology ξένος + τιμή  as "different honor". Xenotime was first described for an occurrence in Vest-Agder, Norway in 1824.

Properties 
Crystallising in the tetragonal (I41/amd) crystal system, xenotime is typically translucent to opaque (rarely transparent) in shades of brown to brownish yellow (most common) but also reddish to greenish brown and gray. Xenotime has a variable habit: It may be prismatic (stubby or slender and elongate) with dipyramidal terminations, in radial or granular aggregates, or rosettes. A soft mineral (Mohs hardness 4.5), xenotime is—in comparison to most other translucent minerals—fairly dense, with a specific gravity between 4.4–5.1. Its lustre, which may be vitreous to resinous, together with its crystal system, may lead to a confusion with zircon (ZrSiO4), the latter having a similar crystal structure and with which xenotime may sometimes occur.

Xenotime has two directions of perfect prismatic cleavage and its fracture is uneven to irregular (sometimes splintery). It is considered brittle and its streak is white. The refractive index of xenotime is 1.720-1.815 with a birefringence of 0.095 (uniaxial positive). Xenotime is dichroic with pink, yellow or yellowish brown seen in the extraordinary ray and brownish yellow, grayish brown or greenish brown seen in the ordinary ray. There is no reaction under ultraviolet light. While xenotime may contain significant amounts of thorium or uranium, the mineral does not undergo metamictization like sphene or zircon would.

Occurrence 
Occurring as a minor accessory mineral, xenotime is found in pegmatites and other igneous rocks, as well as gneisses rich in mica and quartz. Associated minerals include biotite and other micas, chlorite group minerals, quartz, zircon, certain feldspars, analcime, anatase, brookite, rutile, siderite and apatite. Xenotime is also known to be diagenetic: It may form as minute grains or as extremely thin (less than 10 µ) coatings on detrital zircon grains in siliciclastic sedimentary rocks. The importance of these diagenetic xenotime deposits in the radiometric dating of sedimentary rocks is only beginning to be realised.

Discovered in 1824, xenotime's type locality is Hidra (Hitterø), Flekkefjord, Vest-Agder, Norway. Other notable localities include: Arendal and Tvedestrand, Norway; Novo Horizonte, São Paulo, Novo Horizonte, Bahia and Minas Gerais, Brazil; Madagascar and California, Colorado, Georgia, North Carolina and New Hampshire, United States. A new discovery of gemmy, colour change (brownish to yellow) xenotime has been reported from Afghanistan and been found in Pakistan. North of Mount Funabuse in Gifu Prefecture, Japan, a notable basaltic rock is quarried at a hill called Maru-Yama: crystals of xenotime and zircon arranged in a radiating, flower-like pattern are visible in polished slices of the rock, which is known as chrysanthemum stone (translated from the Japanese 菊石 kiku-ishi). This stone is widely appreciated in Japan for its ornamental value.

Small tonnages of xenotime sand are recovered in association with Malaysian tin mining, etc. and are processed commercially. The lanthanide content is typical of "yttrium earth" minerals and runs about two-thirds yttrium, with the remainder being mostly the heavy lanthanides, where the even-numbered lanthanides (such as Gd, Dy, Er, or Yb) each being present at about the 5% level, and the odd-numbered lanthanides (such as Tb, Ho, Tm, Lu) each being present at about the 1% level. Dysprosium is usually the most abundant of the even-numbered heavies, and holmium is the most abundant of the odd-numbered heavies.  The lightest lanthanides are generally better represented in monazite while the heaviest lanthanides are in xenotime.

See also 
List of minerals
Rare-earth mineral
Wakefieldite

References

Further reading
Webster, R. (2000). Gems: Their sources, descriptions and identification (5th ed.), p. 182. Butterworth-Heinemann, Great Britain. ISBN

External links

Yttrium minerals
Phosphate minerals
Tetragonal minerals
Minerals in space group 88
Gemstones